Eric Duhatschek (born 1956) is a Canadian sports journalist. Duhatschek won the 2001 Elmer Ferguson Memorial Award for distinguished ice hockey journalism and is a member of the Hockey Hall of Fame. Duhatschek is also on the selection committee for the Hockey Hall of Fame. Based in Calgary, Alberta, he was the lead hockey columnist for The Globe and Mail and is a writer for The Athletic. Duhatschek rose to prominence for his coverage of the Calgary Flames as a sportswriter for the Calgary Herald.

Career
After graduating from the University of Western Ontario's grad school of journalism, Duhatschek began covering Calgary Flames in 1978 for the Calgary Herald.

In 2000, Duhatschek joined The Globe and Mail as an online columnist. In 2001, Duhatschek was awarded the Elmer Ferguson Memorial Award by the Hockey Hall of Fame and was later elected for the selection committee for the Hockey Hall of Fame. On September 8, 2017, Duhatschek announced he was leaving The Globe to write for The Athletic.

After serving 15 years on the selection committee for the Hockey Hall of Fame, Duhatschek's term ended and he was replaced by Cassie Campbell-Pascall and Mark Chipman in 2018.

Publications
The following is a list of publications:
On fire: the dramatic rise of the Calgary Flames (1986)
100 years of hockey: the chronicle of a century on ice (1999)
Starforce hockey: the greatest players of today and tomorrow (2000)
One hundred and one years of hockey: the chronicles of a century on ice (2001)
Hockey chronicles: an insider history of National Hockey League teams (2001)
King of Russia: a year in the Russian Super League (2008)

Personal life
Duhatschek has a son and daughter. His daughter Paula was awarded the inaugural Jim Kelley Memorial Scholarship by the Professional Hockey Writers' Association.

References

1956 births
Living people
Calgary Flames
Canadian sportswriters
Elmer Ferguson Award winners
National Hockey League broadcasters
The Globe and Mail columnists
Writers from Calgary